Norfolk County Jail could mean

Norfolk County Jail (1795), built in 1795
Norfolk County Jail (1817), built in 1817
Norfolk County Correctional Center, built in 1992